Yahya Modarresi Tehrani (born 1945) is an Iranian linguist and Professor of Linguistics at the Institute for Humanities and Cultural Studies (I.H.C.S.). He is best known for his works on sociolinguistics. He won the Iranian Book of the Year Award for his book An Introduction to Sociolinguistics.

Books
 An Introduction to Sociolinguistics, Tehran: IHCS 1989
 Language and Migration (2015)

References

External links
Modarresi's works

Linguists from Iran
Iranian phonologists
Phoneticians
1945 births
Academic staff of the Institute for Humanities and Cultural Studies
Sociolinguists
University of Tehran alumni
University of Kansas alumni
Living people